Protonycteris was a primitive bat genus in the family Archaeonycteridae with a sole species, Protonycteris gunnelli, found in Vastan Lignite Mine (Ypresian), in India.

References 

 

Eocene bats
Prehistoric bat genera
Prehistoric monotypic mammal genera